Saint-Ours (Auvergnat: Sent Ors) is a commune in the Puy-de-Dôme department in Auvergne in central France.

See also
 Vulcania
 Communes of the Puy-de-Dôme department

References

Saintours
Puy-de-Dôme communes articles needing translation from French Wikipedia